"I Remember" is a song by American recording artist Keyshia Cole. It was written by Cole and Gregory G. Curtis for her second album Just like You (2007), with production helmed by the latter. "I Remember" was released as the album's third single in December 2007 and reached number one on the US Billboard Hot R&B/Hip-Hop Songs chart, while peaking at number 24 on the US Billboard Hot 100.

Music video 
The video for "I Remember" premiered on BET's Access Granted on December 5, 2007. The video was directed by Benny Boom, who has directed fourteen of Cole's videos.

Cover versions 
British soul singer Mica Paris released a cover version of "I Remember" on her 2009 album Born Again. American singer Aretha Franklin covered the song in her live shows in 2008 and 2014.

Credits and personnel 
Credits adapted from the liner notes of Just like You.

Keyshia Cole – arranger, vocals, writer
Gregory G. Curtis – producer, writer
Ron Fair – arranger, conductor
Jaycen Joshua – mixing engineer
Dave Pensado – mixing engineer
Allen Sides – strings
Andrew Wuepper – assistant mixing engineer

Charts

Weekly charts

Year-end charts

See also
List of number-one R&B/hip-hop songs of 2008 (U.S.)

References 

2007 singles
Keyshia Cole songs
Music videos directed by Benny Boom
Contemporary R&B ballads
Songs written by Keyshia Cole
2007 songs
Geffen Records singles
2000s ballads